Arsenite oxidase may refer to:

 Arsenate reductase (cytochrome c)
 Arsenate reductase (azurin)